Ndudi Hamani Ebi (born 18 June 1984) is an English-born Nigerian former professional basketball player who most notably played for the Minnesota Timberwolves of the National Basketball Association (NBA) between 2003 and 2005.

He initially committed to the University of Arizona, before making himself eligible for the NBA Draft. Ebi was selected out of Westbury Christian School by the Minnesota Timberwolves in the first round (26th pick overall) of the 2003 NBA draft. In 2007-08 he was the top rebounder in the Israel Basketball Premier League.

Ebi was raised in Nigeria before moving to Houston, Texas, as a teenager to attend high school. He holds both British and Nigerian citizenship.

Professional career
Ebi was the first first-round pick in three years for the Wolves; the team had forfeited five first-round picks after the team owner illegally made a deal with forward Joe Smith (the penalty was later reduced to three picks). After Ebi appeared in 19 games over the course of two seasons, Minnesota attempted to get an exception from the NBA so they could send him to the NBA Development League. Ebi was technically ineligible as the 2005–06 NBA season was his third year, and the D-League only accepted players who had been in the NBA for less than two years.  Minnesota wanted to guide Ebi in, and they tacitly argued that Ebi was hardly a two-year veteran in the figurative sense, given his limited playing time. The league rejected Minnesota's request regarding Ebi, and to make room for Ronald Dupree, Minnesota released Ebi on 31 October 2005.

That two seasons with the Timberwolves ended up being Ebi's only playing time in the NBA, as his final game was on April 20th, 2005 in a 95 - 73 win over the San Antonio Spurs. In his final game, Ebi recorded 18 points and 8 rebounds.

Ebi signed a free agent contract over the summer of 2006 with the Dallas Mavericks. After playing five pre-season games, averaging 5.2 points per game (ppg), Ebi was waived by the Mavericks on 26 October 2006.

On 30 September 2007, he signed with Israeli club Bnei HaSharon for one season. In 2007-08 he was the top rebounder in the Israel Basketball Premier League.

On 3 August 2008, he signed with Italian club Carife Ferrara, newly promoted to Serie A. He later played for the Basket Rimini Crabs in Italy and averaged 15.3 points per game, 13.6 rebounds per game, and 3.2 steals per game. In March 2011, he signed with Limoges CSP. In summer 2011, he signed with Anibal Zahle in Lebanon and thus joined the Division 1 of the Lebanese Basketball League. In 2012, he signed with Sidigas Avellino of Italy. He signed with the Vaqueros de Bayamón in 2013. On 4 February 2014, he signed with Virtus Bologna of Italy.

On 15 January 2015, after playing for Egyptian team Zamalek, Ebi returned to Italy after signing with Virtus Roma.

On 28 July 2015, Ebi signed with Auxilium CUS Torino.

On 7 April 2017, Ebi signed with Shahrdari Tabriz of the Iranian Basketball Super League.

On December 15, 2017, Ebi signed with French club Boulazac Basket Dordogne.

NBA statistics

Regular season

References

External links
Basketball-Reference.com: Ndudi Ebi
NBA.com Draft Profile
LNB Pro A Profile
Safsal.co.il Profile

1984 births
Living people
Auxilium Pallacanestro Torino players
Basketball players from Greater London
Basketball players from Houston
Basket Rimini Crabs players
Black British sportspeople
Bnei HaSharon players
English men's basketball players
English expatriate sportspeople in Israel
English expatriate sportspeople in Italy
English people of Nigerian descent
Israeli Basketball Premier League players
Jiangsu Dragons players
McDonald's High School All-Americans
Minnesota Timberwolves draft picks
Minnesota Timberwolves players
National Basketball Association high school draftees
Nigerian expatriate basketball people in Italy
Nigerian expatriate basketball people in the United States
Nigerian expatriates in Israel
Nigerian men's basketball players
Pallacanestro Virtus Roma players
Parade High School All-Americans (boys' basketball)
Power forwards (basketball)
S.S. Felice Scandone players
Virtus Bologna players
Zamalek SC basketball players
Manama Club basketball players